Hinterhubera is a genus of flowering plants in the family Asteraceae.

They are native to northern Colombia and north-western Venezuela.

The genus name of Hinterhubera is in honour of Rudolph Hinterhuber (1802–1892), an Austrian botanist and apothecary in Bolzano and Mondsee.
It was first described and published in Chlor. Andina Vol.1 on page 185 in 1857.

Known species
According to Kew;

References

Asteraceae genera
Astereae
Plants described in 1857
Flora of Colombia
Flora of Venezuela